Irineu Esteve Altimiras (born 21 June 1996) is an Andorran cross-country skier who competes internationally.

He competed for Andorra at the FIS Nordic World Ski Championships 2017 in Lahti, Finland.

Cross-country skiing results
All results are sourced from the International Ski Federation (FIS).

Olympic Games

Distance reduced to 30 km due to weather conditions.

World Championships

World Cup

Season standings

Notes

References

External links 
 
 
 

1996 births
Living people
Andorran male cross-country skiers
Tour de Ski skiers
Cross-country skiers at the 2018 Winter Olympics
Cross-country skiers at the 2022 Winter Olympics
Olympic cross-country skiers of Andorra